Clanculus ringens, common name the ringent clanculus, is a species of sea snail, a marine gastropod mollusk in the family Trochidae, the top snails.

Description
The size of the shell varies between 8 mm and 13 mm. The perforate shell has a conical shape and contains 7 whorls. The first whorl is smooth, yellowish; the following whorls are planulate, separated by canalicidate sutures. They are maculate with chestnut and white. They are spirally cingulate above with 4 elegantly granulate ridges, the upper and lower the larger. The body whorl is acutely carinated. The base of the shell is slightly convex, ornamented with 8 to 9 granose cinguli . The oblique aperture is rhomboidal and narrow. The basal margin is sulcate-denticulate. The oblique columella is strong and terminates below in a large tooth, ringent above. The columella is callous, ringent, and plicate.

Distribution
This marine species is endemic to Australia and occurs off South Australia and Western Australia.

References

 Menke, C.T. 1843. Molluscorum Novae Hollandiae Specimen in Libraria Aulica Hahniana. Hannover : Hahniana 46 pp
 Philippi, R.A. 1852. Trochidae. pp. 233–248 in Küster, H.C. (ed). Systematisches Conchylien-Cabinet von Martini und Chemnitz. Nürnberg : Bauer & Raspe Vol. 2
 Fischer, P. 1877. Genres Calcar, Trochus, Xenophora, Tectarius et Risella. pp. 115–240 in Keiner, L.C. (ed.). Spécies general et iconographie des coquilles vivantes. Paris : J.B. Baillière Vol. 11
 Tate, R. 1881. On Menke's Australian Shells. Proceedings of the Linnean Society of New South Wales 6(2): 387-408 
 Hedley, C. 1902. Notes on Tasmanian Conchology. Papers and Proceedings of the Royal Society of Tasmania 1902: 77-78 
 Cotton, B.C. & Godfrey, F.K. 1934. South Australian Shells. Part 11. South Australian Naturalist 15(3): 77-92 
 Cotton, B.C. 1959. South Australian Mollusca. Archaeogastropoda. Handbook of the Flora and Fauna of South Australia. Adelaide : South Australian Government Printer 449 pp
 Wells, F.E. & Bryce, C.W. 1986. Seashells of Western Australia. Perth : Western Australian Museum 207 pp
 Wilson, B. 1993. Australian Marine Shells. Prosobranch Gastropods. Kallaroo, Western Australia : Odyssey Publishing Vol. 1 408 pp
 Jansen, P. 1995. A review of the genus Clanculus Montfort, 1810 (Gastropoda: Trochidae) in Australia, with description of a new subspecies and the introduction of a nomen novum. Vita Marina 43(1-2): 39-62

External links
 To Biodiversity Heritage Library (7 publications)
 To World Register of Marine Species
 

ringens
Gastropods of Australia
Gastropods described in 1843